is an autobahn in northwestern Germany, connecting southwestern Hamburg to Geesthacht.

Exit list

 

|}

External links 

25
A025
A025